The Aripuana antwren (Herpsilochmus stotzi) is an insectivorous bird in the antbird family Thamnophilidae. It is found in central Amazonian Brazil.

The Aripuana antwren was first described in 2013.

References

 

Aripuana antwren
Birds of the Brazilian Amazon
Endemic birds of Brazil
Aripuana antwren